Ivan Lukačević (7 October 1946 – 26 July 2003) was a Croatian professional footballer who played as a striker.

Career
Lukačević played in Croatia for Mladost Seleš, Dinamo Orlovnjak, NK Valpovka Valpovo, NK Belišće and NK Osijek, and in the NASL between 1975 and 1980 for the Toronto Metros-Croatia and Toronto Blizzard. He scored the second of Toronto's three goals in the 54th minute of their 3–0 Soccer Bowl victory in 1976.

References

External links
 NASL career stats

1946 births
2003 deaths
Sportspeople from Osijek
Association football forwards
Yugoslav footballers
NK Belišće players
NK Osijek players
Toronto Blizzard (1971–1984) players
Yugoslav First League players
North American Soccer League (1968–1984) players
Yugoslav expatriate footballers
Expatriate soccer players in Canada
Yugoslav expatriate sportspeople in Canada